The 2008 Idaho Republican presidential primary took place on May 27, 2008.  John McCain won the primary, although before the election he had already won enough pledged delegates in earlier primaries to secure his nomination at the 2008 Republican National Convention.

Texas Congressman Ron Paul finished second with 24 percent of the vote, which was his best showing in a primary state even though McCain had been declared the presumptive Republican nominee several weeks before the Idaho primary.

Results

See also
 2008 Idaho Democratic presidential caucuses
 2008 Republican Party presidential primaries

References

Idaho
2008 Idaho elections
2008
Idaho presidential primaries